The Extreme Adventures of Super Dave is a 2000 comedy film starring the comedian Bob Einstein as Super Dave Osborne.

Plot
After the kind-hearted but clumsy Super Dave Osborne (Bob Einstein) survives a near-fatal accident, he discovers his manager has embezzled from him. This forces him into bankruptcy and causes him to lose his house. Super Dave decides to retire from stunt work, but ends up meeting a single mother named Sandy (Gia Carides). When Super Dave learns that Sandy's son, Timmy (Carl Michael Lindner) needs an expensive heart surgery, Super Dave comes out of retirement to raise the money. In the process, he must face off against his arch-enemy, Gil Ruston (Dan Hedaya).

Cast
Bob Einstein as Super Dave Osborne
Dan Hedaya	as Gil Ruston
Gia Carides as Sandy
Don Lake as Donald
Art Irizawa as Fuji
Brett Miller as Randy / fire chief
Mike Walden as Michael
Carl Michael Lindner as Little Timmy
Steve Van Wormer as DJ
Ray Charles as himself 
Michael Buffer as himself	
Evander Holyfield as himself
John Elway as himself
David Barco as himself
Daniel Raymont as Hairdresser
Pamela Paulshock  as Manicurist
Jim Doughan as Super Dave's Doctor
Billy Barty as Funeral Eulogist (uncredited)

Release
The movie was released direct to DVD and VHS and has been shown on Sky Movies and Charge!. It was released on Blu-ray on September 13, 2022 by Kino Lorber.

References

External links

2000 direct-to-video films
2000 films
American comedy films
Films about stunt performers
Films directed by Peter MacDonald
Metro-Goldwyn-Mayer direct-to-video films
2000 comedy films
2000s English-language films
2000s American films